There are dozens of cultivars of the onion (Allium cepa), one of the most widely cultivated species of the genus Allium, But there are also other species cultivated as 'onions'. Many are named after the first person to breed them, or the locality they came from. Different localities often use their own common names for cultivars that are genetically almost identical. Sometimes different cultivars are known by the same common name (for example the name 'Chinese chives' could be referring to Allium odorum or Allium tuberosum).
This list is based on the USDAs accepted classification.

Cultivar names

References

Lists of cultivars